Michael David Hinton  (May 4, 1956 – August 1, 2013) was an American guitarist, residing in the San Francisco Bay Area. During his career, he played with numerous bands, including Norton Buffalo and the Knockouts, High Noon, Merl Saunders & the Rainforest Band, to name a few.  He appeared on several albums with the Rainforest Band and other Merl Saunders projects, including It's In The Air, Fiesta Amazonica, Still Having Fun, Merl Saunders With His Funky Friends - Live, and Still Groovin' .

Career
Hinton played with Country Joe and Friends, and recorded with Rick Danko on A Tribute To Jerry Garcia: Deadhead Festival in Tokyo, Japan, 1997. He was also on the Roky Erickson albums, Don't Slander Me and You're Gonna Miss Me: The Best Of Roky Erickson. Among his other credits are his involvement in the Mickey Hart and Merl Saunders band, High Noon, and Freddie Roulette and Friends. He co-wrote the music for the films Stacy's Knights (1982) and Eddie Macon's Run (1983), and played on the score for the 1980s remake of the television program, The Twilight Zone with Jerry Garcia, John Cipollina, David Grisman and others. Hinton also co-wrote several songs with the late Norton Buffalo, world-renowned harmonica player, as well as playing lead guitar in Norton's band for approximately seven years, beginning in late 1980.

Hinton played several Merl Saunders tributes since the keyboardist's death in October 2008. A re-launch of the Rainforest Band as a tribute to Saunders took place at the 29th Starwood Festival on July 25, 2009, the site of their last performance, featuring Saunder's son and bassist Tony Saunders, Hinton, Sikiru Adepoju and other members of the Rainforest Band and other Saunders' projects.

Performed or recorded with

 Grateful Dead: Jerry Garcia, Bob Weir, Phil Lesh, Brent Mydland, Tom Constanten, Vince Welnick, Mickey Hart, Bill Kreutzmann 
 Quicksilver Messenger Service: John Cippolina, David Frieberg 
 Jefferson Airplane/Jefferson Starship: Jack Casady, Don Baldwin, Pete Sears
 Santana: Jose "Chepito" Areas, Michael Carabello
 Country Joe and the Fish / Country Joe McDonald and Friends: Joe McDonald, Barry Melton
 Rainforest Band: Merl Saunders, Muruga Booker, Vince Littleton, Michael Warren, Tony Saunders 
 Johnnie Johnson and Unreal
 Max Gail Band
 High Noon: Mickey Hart, Jim McPherson (Copperhead), Bobby Vega (Etta James)
 Norton Buffalo and the Knockouts
 Schellville Southside Blues Band
 Zero: Greg Anton, Chip Roland, Steve Kimock   
 Sons of Champlin: Geoffrey Palmer, Jim Preston
 Barry Melton Band
 Peter Albin (Big Brother and the Holding Company)
 Byron Allred (Steve Miller Band)
 Trey Anastasio (Phish)
 Maya Angelou 
 Babatunde Olatunji
 Joan Baez
 John Barbata (Dinosaurs)
 Elvin Bishop
 Bobby Black
 Vernon Black (Mariah Carey)
 Ed Bogas
 O'Teal Burbage (Allman Brothers)
 Paul Butterfield
 Ray Chew (Showtime at the Apollo)
 Vassar Clements (Old & In the Way)
 The Coasters
 Lacy J. Dalton
 Rick Danko (The Band)
 John Dawson (New Riders of the Purple Sage)
 Austin de Lone
 Lance Dickerson (Commander Cody)
 Greg Douglass (Steve Miller Band)
 Roky Erickson (13th Floor Elevators)
 Steve Erquiaga (Andy Narell)
 Greg Errico
 Mimi Farina (Bread and Roses)
 Billy C. Farlow (Commander Cody)
 Martin Fiero (Legion of Mary)
 Mic Gillette (Tower of Power)
 Nate Ginsberg (Herbie Hancock)
 Bill Graham
 Nick Gravenites (Electric Flag)
 Rusty Gauthier (New Riders of the Purple Sage)
 David Grisman
 Billy Hart (Herbie Hancock)
 Edwin Hawkins Singers
 Mark Isham
 Dr. John
 Matt Kelly (Kingfish)
 Kronos Quartet
 Lowell "Banana" Levinger (The Youngbloods)
 Huey Lewis
 Carl Lockett (Jimmy Smith)
 Harvey Mandel
 Mel Martin
 Scott Mathews
 John McFee (Clover/Doobie Brothers)
 Buddy Miles (Electric Flag/Jimi Hendrix)
 Steve Miller
 Ziggy Modeliste
 Eddie Moore (Woody Shaw)
 Maria Muldaur
 Charlie Musselwhite
 Mark Naftalin (Butterfield Blues Band)
 Odetta 
 Sammy Piazza (Hot Tuna)
 John Popper (Blues Traveler)
 Jimmy Pugh (Robert Cray Band)
 Chuck Rainey (Steely Dan)
 Vicki Randle (George Benson/Tonight Show)
 Brett Rasmussen (Merl Saunders)
 Roy Rogers
 Freddie Roulette
 John Schneider (Dukes of Hazzard)
 Melvin Seals (Jerry Garcia Band)
 Ron Stallings (Reconstruction/Elvin Bishop)
 Luther Tucker (Little Walter Jacobs)
 Bill Vitt (Saunders-Garcia Band)
 Narada Michael Walden
 "Bishop" Norman Williams
 Kate Wolf

Television appearances and work
 "Q" for KQED (Merl Saunders and the Rainforest Band live)
 KGO Curethon (Merl Saunders and the Rainforest Band live)
 Tales From The Crypt (TV series) (HBO) "On A Dead Man's Chest" Directed by William Friedkin (The Exorcist)
 Rediscovering The Amazon - Filmed on the Amazon River (Documentary for Moondragon Pictures)
 The Twilight Zone (CBS) "The Girl That I Married" (with John Cippolina), "Shelter Skelter", "Joy Ride", "The Junction" (with David Grisman), "Dead Run" (with Bob Weir, Brent Mydland)
 Studio Cafe (Norton Buffalo and Michael Hinton duo live)
 Norton Buffalo and the Knockouts live (KRCB)
 Sports America (Abe Lemons and Eddie Sutton — NCAA Basketball Coaches)
 "Revenge Of The Insects" (for PBS with Barry Melton and Mickey Hart)

Discography
 I Ain't No Angel - Lindy Gravelle (1982)
 Don't Slander Me - Roky Erickson (1986) Restless Records
 You're Gonna Miss Me: The Best Of Roky Erickson (1991) Restless Records
 It's In The Air - Merl Saunders & the Rainforest Band (1993) Summertone Records
 Still Having Fun - Merl Saunders (1995) Summertone Records
 Fiesta Amazonica - Merl Saunders (& the Rainforest Band) (1998) Summertone Records
 Merl Saunders With His Funky Friends - Live (1998) Summertone Records
 Still Groovin - Merl Saunders (2004) Summertone Records
 San Francisco After Dark - Merl Saunders
 A Promise Kept - Jim McPherson (2009)
 Keystone Revisited - Tony Saunders, Michael Hinton, Bill Vitt, Steve Abramson, Jeff Pevar (2013)
 Sonoma Soundtrack - Schellville Southside Blues Band
 Joan Baez (unreleased tracks) - produced by Mickey Hart (Featuring members of the Grateful Dead and High Noon) (2001)

Filmography

Scores
 Stacy's Knights (1982) (with Kevin Costner) co-wrote the music with Norton Buffalo and performed, Crown International Pictures
 Eddie Macon's Run (1983) (with Kirk Douglas, John Schneider) co-wrote with Norton Buffalo and performed soundtrack, Universal Pictures/ MCA

DVDs
 Saunders & Friends by John Metzger - The Music Box November 1998, Volume 5, #11
 Chet Helms: Tribal Stomp (with Country Joe McDonald and Friends)
 2B1 Multimedia

Laser disc
 A Tribute To Jerry Garcia: Deadhead Festival in Tokyo, Japan, 1997 (1997/8) Japanese Laser Disc NTSC - VAP Video Super Rock series VPLR-70650

References

External links

1956 births
Place of birth missing
2013 deaths
Guitarists from California
20th-century American guitarists
Rainforest Band members